The 2018–19 season was the 133rd in the history of Luton Town Football Club, a professional association football club based in Luton, Bedfordshire, England. Their promotion from League Two in 2017–18 meant it was the club's first season in League One after a 10-year absence and 93rd season in the English Football League. The season ran from 1 July 2018 to 30 June 2019.

Background and pre-season

The 2017–18 season was Nathan Jones' second full season as manager of Luton Town, having been appointed in January 2016. Luton began the season with an 8–2 victory over Yeovil Town, the club's biggest Football League victory since December 1996. Inconsistent results in their first six league matches left the club in mid-table, but seven wins from their next nine league matches, including a 7–1 win over Stevenage, saw Luton return to the top of the table. The club's first defeat in 10 league matches meant they lost first place once more, but they soon regained it three matches later, during which time they became the first team in the history of the Football League to score seven or more goals on three occasions before Christmas, after defeating Cambridge United 7–0. By early December, Luton were the highest-scoring team in the country with 63 goals in all competitions. However, their FA Cup third round exit at the hands of Newcastle United in January was followed up with a run of four wins from 12 league matches, which meant they relinquished first position once again in March. Luton finished the season in second place and were promoted to League One after a 10-year absence.

Review

August
Luton started the season with a 1–0 away defeat to Portsmouth on their return to League One, with Jamal Lowe scoring the winning goal in the 16th minute. The team recorded their first point of the season after drawing 1–1 at home to Sunderland, who took the lead shortly before half-time through Josh Maja with a shot into the bottom corner, before Matty Pearson equalised on 68 minutes from Alan Sheehan's cross. This was followed by a 1–0 away defeat to West Bromwich Albion in the first round of the EFL Cup, after Oliver Burke scored for the Championship team in the 62nd minute. Luton were beaten 3–1 away to Peterborough United, who were three goals up by half-time with two goals from Jason Cummings and one from Siriki Dembélé, before Danny Hylton scored a consolation goal for Luton from Andrew Shinnie's cross 12 minutes from time. Their first win of the season came after a 2–0 home victory over Southend United, in which Elliot Lee scored from seven yards to give Luton a second-minute lead after a shot from Pelly Ruddock Mpanzu deflected into his path. Hylton finished the scoring on 33 minutes with a penalty after Lee was fouled by Elvis Bwomono in the penalty area. Luton recorded a second successive home win after beating Shrewsbury Town 3–2, the away team taking the lead through a 23rd-minute penalty scored by Shaun Whalley. Jorge Grant levelled the score early into the second half with a free kick from 20 yards, before Lee Angol restored Shrewsbury's lead 15 minutes later after capitalising on a mistake by James Shea. Jack Stacey equalised from close range in the 73rd minute, and Lee scored the winning goal with a deflected 22-yard free kick three minutes later. Leeds United midfielder Eunan O'Kane was signed on loan until 10 January 2019, while Jake Jervis and Luke Gambin were loaned to AFC Wimbledon and Crawley Town respectively until the end of the season.

September
Luton went behind away to Wycombe Wanderers when Joe Jacobson scored a penalty in the 15th minute, who had another penalty saved by Shea in the second half, before Pearson equalised with a 68th-minute header, meaning the match ended in a 1–1 draw. Forward Josh Neufville signed a two-year professional contract with the club. Aaron Jarvis scored with a powerful shot into the bottom corner from six yards to give Luton a fifth-minute lead at home to Brighton & Hove Albion U21 in their opening EFL Trophy group stage match, and Grant scored on 79 minutes with a deflected shot to make the score 2–0. However, Brighton scored a consolation goal through Aaron Connolly with a header in the 86th minute, and the match finished as a 2–1 victory. Assistant manager Paul Hart was released from his contract to allow him to join Notts County as technical director. A 2–1 defeat away to Doncaster Rovers saw Luton's four-match unbeaten run come to an end, with the home team taking the lead in the sixth minute through Matty Blair. Lee equalised with a header shortly before half-time, and Ben Whiteman scored the winner for Doncaster less than a minute into the second half with a deflected 20-yard shot. Shinnie scored Luton's only goal in a 1–0 home win over Bristol Rovers with a low shot in the 62nd minute. Luton then drew 0–0 away to Blackpool. Free agent winger Kazenga LuaLua was signed on a contract until the end of the season. Luton drew 2–2 at home to Charlton Athletic, who had been on a four-match winning run. After going behind to Tariqe Fosu's 23rd-minute penalty, Luton scored two second half goals through Harry Cornick and James Collins, before Chris Solly equalised for Charlton with a volley in the fifth minute of stoppage time.

October
Steve Rutter, a former coach educator for The Football Association who taught Jones during his coaching courses, was appointed as assistant manager. Luton achieved their first away win of the season after beating Oxford United 2–1. Ricky Holmes gave the home team the lead early in the second half, before Luton equalised through Collins who followed up for the rebound after Cornick's shot had hit the crossbar from Mpanzu's cross. Potts scored the winning goal in the 98th minute with a header from Sheehan's free kick, after he had a goal disallowed earlier in stoppage time. Luton won 3–2 at home to Scunthorpe United, and took the lead in the 10th minute with a Cornick shot from a tight angle, before Scunthorpe equalised seven minutes later through Lee Novak. Lee restored Luton's lead in the 26th minute with a 20-yard left-footed shot and James Justin converted Stacey's low cross on 85 minutes, before Stephen Humphrys scored a consolation goal for Scunthorpe in stoppage time. Luton progressed to the second round of the EFL Trophy as Southern Group H winners after a 3–0 home win over Milton Keynes Dons, in which they took the lead in the 17th minute when Sheehan scored a penalty after David Kasumu tripped Shinnie. LuaLua doubled the lead with a curling shot into the bottom corner on 29 minutes, and Grant finished the scoring 15 minutes into the second half with a close-range header.

After a six-match unbeaten run in all competitions, Luton were defeated 3–2 away to Barnsley, with Brad Potts giving the home team the lead on five minutes with a low shot from 20 yards, and Cameron McGeehan scored in the 26th minute to make the score 2–0. Collins scored both of Luton's goals, the first in first-half stoppage time with a penalty, and the second in the 86th minute from the rebound after LuaLua's cross hit the post, either side of Mamadou Thiam's curling shot on 79 minutes. Luton entered their home match against Walsall with the visitors unbeaten away from home, and won 2–0 with goals scored in each half by Glen Rea from a Grant corner and Grant with a free kick from 25 yards. Luton moved into the play-off positions with a 4–1 home win over Accrington Stanley, taking the lead on five minutes when Hylton converted Justin's cross with a volley from close range, before the away team equalised through Offrande Zanzala with a powerful header in the 27th minute. After Shinnie restored Luton's lead with a 20-yard shot into the bottom corner in the 53rd minute, Hylton scored a minute later, before he completed his hat-trick on 70 minutes with a close-range header. Frankie Musonda joined National League South club Oxford City on a one-month loan. Luton won away to AFC Wimbledon in a league match for the first time after a 2–0 victory, with Mpanzu and Lee scoring in the second half.

November
Shea made a number of saves as Luton held Rochdale to a 0–0 away draw, in which Hylton was sent off for a studs-up challenge on Ian Henderson. Luton beat Wycombe Wanderers 2–0 at home in the first round of the FA Cup, with Shinnie opening the scoring from a left-footed 25-yard curling shot in off the post in the 41st minute, before Cornick capitalised on a mistake by Adam El-Abd, scoring with a shot into the bottom corner on 71 minutes. The team lost 2–1 away to Peterborough United in their final EFL Trophy group stage match, and were 2–0 down at half-time after goals from Colin Daniel and Ivan Toney, before Luton recorded a consolation goal after goalkeeper Conor O'Malley dropped Pearson's cross and scored an own goal in the 73rd minute.

Luton achieved their first home league win over Plymouth Argyle since 2003 after a 5–1 victory. Collins opened the scoring in the 12th minute with a shot into the bottom corner, before Lee rebounded in Cornick's parried shot on 23 minutes. Justin extended the lead six minutes later, and won a penalty in first-half stoppage time converted by Collins, which made the half-time score 4–0. Collins completed his hat-trick in the second half, and Plymouth scored a consolation goal through Joel Grant late into the match. Luton won for the seventh time in nine league matches after beating Gillingham 3–1 away, a result that saw them move into fourth place in the table. Shinnie gave Luton the lead in the 25th minute with a shot from the edge of the penalty area before Lee doubled the lead 10 minutes into the second half with a shot in off the crossbar from Collins' low cross. Lee made it 3–0 on 68 minutes with a shot into an empty net after Cornick's low shot hit the post, and Tom Eaves scored a consolation goal for Gillingham four minutes later from a tight angle. Justin rebounded in Cornick's parried shot to give Luton a 28th-minute lead in a home match against Bradford City. Lee scored twice in five minutes to make the score 3–0, and in the second half Cornick finished the scoring in the 89th minute, meaning the match ended in a 4–0 win.

December
Luton won 1–0 away in their second round match of the FA Cup against Bury, with Cornick scoring the winning goal in the 42nd minute. Luton then played Southend United at home in the EFL Trophy second round, and took the lead in the 81st minute through Arthur Read with a shot from 18 yards before Stephen McLaughlin equalised for the visitors seven minutes later with a deflected 20-yard shot. The match finished 1–1 after normal time and Luton lost the penalty shoot-out 4–2, meaning they were eliminated from the competition. Luton moved into the automatic promotion places in second place with a 2–0 home win over Fleetwood Town, in which they took the lead on 11 minutes when Cornick converted Shinnie's low cross, before Craig Morgan scored an own goal in the 80th minute. Connor Tomlinson joined National League South club Hemel Hempstead Town on a youth loan for one month.

Luton won away to Coventry City for the first time since 1987 after a 2–1 victory, with the team's goals coming in the 38th and 57th minute from Pearson and Collins respectively, before Jonson Clarke-Harris scored a consolation goal for Coventry with a stoppage time penalty. Luton moved four points clear of third-placed Sunderland after beating Burton Albion 2–0 at home. Stacey opened the scoring in the first half with a left-footed shot into the bottom corner, and in the second half Collins scored a penalty after Hylton was fouled by Jamie Allen in the penalty area. Midfielder Drew Richardson, a first-year scholar, joined Isthmian League Premier Division club Harlow Town on work experience for one month. Shinnie and Cornick scored in each half of Luton's 2–0 away win over Scunthorpe United, a result that saw them move one point behind league-leaders Portsmouth. Luton had fallen two goals behind away to Walsall by the 67th minute with goals from Morgan Ferrier and Andy Cook. Collins brought Luton back into the match five minutes later with a shot through the legs of goalkeeper Liam Roberts from 10 yards, before LuaLua equalised in the fourth minute of stoppage time, meaning the match ended in a 2–2 draw. The result meant Luton would begin 2019 on a 12-match unbeaten league run.

January
Luton's first result of 2019 was a 0–0 home draw with Barnsley, with the best chance of the match coming from Lee's 20-yard shot which was saved by goalkeeper Adam Davies. Luton drew 0–0 away to Sheffield Wednesday to earn a third round replay in the FA Cup. Midfielder George Thorne joined on loan from Derby County until the end of the season, while Grant returned to Nottingham Forest after his loan was terminated early. Jones left Luton after being appointed the manager of Championship club Stoke City, with chief recruitment officer Mick Harford being appointed interim manager. Musonda joined Hemel Hempstead Town on loan until the end of the season. Collins scored a 67th-minute penalty as Luton came from behind to draw 1–1 away to Sunderland after Chris Maguire had given the home team the lead on 16 minutes. Luton were knocked out of the FA Cup after losing 1–0 at home to Sheffield Wednesday in a third round replay, who scored their goal a minute into the second half through Atdhe Nuhiu. Barnsley midfielder George Moncur was signed on a two-and-a-half-year contract for an undisclosed fee, and Jack James joined Havant & Waterlooville of the National League on a one-month youth loan.

Luton moved to within a point of Portsmouth once more with a 4–0 home win over Peterborough United, courtesy of a Collins hat-trick and Luke Berry's first goal of the season. Defender Toby Byron, a second-year scholar, joined Southern League Premier Division Central club Hitchin Town on work experience for one month. Pearson scored a 29th-minute header from a Justin corner as Luton beat Southend United 1–0 away and moved to the top of the table. Famewo was recalled from his loan at Grimsby and joined Championship club Norwich City for an undisclosed fee. Luton recorded their first league win over Portsmouth since 1995 after a 3–2 home victory, a result which saw them move five points clear of their second-placed opponents. The team were 1–0 up at half-time through Collins with a shot into the bottom corner, before Ronan Curtis equalised for Portsmouth early in the second half. Collins restored Luton's lead with a 77th-minute penalty, and Omar Bogle scored two minutes later to bring the score to 2–2, before Moncur scored the winner for Luton on 86 minutes with a free kick into the bottom corner. Queens Park Rangers defender Alex Baptiste, Nottingham Forest and Scotland international striker Jason Cummings, and Brighton & Hove Albion striker Aaron Connolly, a Republic of Ireland under-19 international, were signed on loan for the rest of 2018–19, while Lloyd Jones, Jack Senior and Jarvis were loaned to Plymouth, Harrogate Town and Falkirk respectively until the end of the season.

February
Luton moved six points clear at the top of the League One table with a 3–0 away win over Shrewsbury Town, in which Collins scored in each half, either side of Pearson's 53rd-minute cross into the top corner. This was followed by another 3–0 victory, this time at home to Wycombe Wanderers, which meant Luton equalled a club record of 19 matches unbeaten in the Football League. Luton took the lead in the 33rd minute when Collins converted Stacey's cross, before Moncur scored twice late in the second half. Harford's appointment as interim manager was extended until the end of the season. Luton set a new club record of 20 matches unbeaten in the Football League after beating Fleetwood Town 2–1 away. Moncur opened the scoring in the first half with a free kick into the top corner, and in the second half Mpanzu scored with a 20-yard curling shot before Fleetwood recorded a consolation goal through Paddy Madden in stoppage time. Read joined Hemel Hempstead Town on a one-month youth loan. Luton's six-match winning run came to an end after drawing 1–1 at home to Coventry City, in which Luton took the lead in the 16th minute through Pearson with a header from Justin's corner, before Jordan Shipley scored Coventry's equaliser later in the first half.

March
Hylton scored his first goal since October to give Luton a 59th-minute lead at home to Rochdale, before Collins scored his 20th goal of the season in stoppage time, meaning the team won 2–0. Luton extended their unbeaten league run to 23 matches after drawing 0–0 away to Plymouth Argyle. Stacey scored in the 16th minute from a low shot as Luton beat Bradford City 1–0 away, and the result meant the team set a new club record of 12 away matches unbeaten in the Football League. Goalkeeper Tiernan Parker joined Hitchin Town on a work experience loan. Luton were held by Gillingham to a 2–2 home draw, in which they took the lead shortly before half-time through Hylton, before Tom Eaves equalised for the away team with a header early in the second half. Stacey restored Luton's lead on 67 minutes with a near post shot past goalkeeper Tomáš Holý, and Luke O'Neill finished the scoring for Gillingham 12 minutes later with a free kick into the top corner. Mpanzu gave Luton a 33rd-minute lead at home to Doncaster Rovers with a 20-yard side-footed shot into the bottom corner, before Hylton doubled the lead with a close-range finish on 57 minutes. LuaLua made the score 3–0 in the 82nd minute, and Berry finished the scoring in stoppage time. Luton won an away league match against Bristol Rovers for the first time since 1980 with a 2–1 victory and equalled a club record of 27 league matches unbeaten in the process. Luton took a two-goal lead through Collins and Berry, before Jonson Clarke-Harris scored a consolation goal for Bristol Rovers in first-half stoppage time.

April and May
Luton drew 2–2 at home to Blackpool and extended their unbeaten league run to a club record 28 matches. Collins opened the scoring for Luton in the sixth minute from LuaLua's low cross, before Nya Kirby equalised for the visitors with a 20-yard volley on 30 minutes. Collins was sent off after receiving two yellow cards in two second-half minutes, and after Blackpool took the lead through Matty Virtue, Cummings scored four minutes from time to bring the score to 2–2. Luton lost 3–1 away to Charlton Athletic, despite taking the lead in the 15th minute through Cornick with a shot into the top corner. Lyle Taylor scored twice during the second half for the home team, the first coming on 54 minutes with a penalty and the second coming on 72 minutes from a low shot, either side of Igor Vetokele's 70th-minute goal. The result ended Luton's run of 76 matches unbeaten in all competitions in which they scored the opening goal.

Luton won 3–0 away to Accrington Stanley, and took the lead through Collins with a penalty in the 24th minute, before Mpanzu scored twice in the second half. This was followed by a 2–2 home draw with AFC Wimbledon, in which Luton took the lead on eight minutes through Lee from close range, before Joe Pigott equalised for the away team with a header in the 28th minute from Anthony Wordsworth's cross. Collins restored Luton's lead on 39 minutes with a powerful header, before Steve Seddon scored AFC Wimbledon's equaliser in second-half stoppage time. Luton's final away match of the season ended in a 2–1 defeat to Burton Albion, resulting in the team only being above second-placed Barnsley on goal difference. Collins gave Luton a 30th-minute lead from close range, before Burton scored twice in the second half through Lucas Akins. Luton were promoted to the Championship after Portsmouth were defeated 3–2 at home to Peterborough and Sunderland lost 2–1 away to Fleetwood. Graeme Jones was appointed as manager two days later, officially taking charge on 7 May 2019. Moncur scored a 25-yard free kick to give Luton a third-minute lead in their last match of the season at home to Oxford United, and Lee scored early in the second half to make the score 2–0. Luke Garbutt brought Oxford back into the match on 60 minutes, before Moncur restored Luton's two-goal advantage in the 73rd minute from close range, meaning the match ended in a 3–1 win. This meant Luton won the League One title and finished three points clear of second-placed Barnsley.

Competitions

EFL League One

League table

FA Cup

EFL Cup

EFL Trophy

First round (Southern Section Group H)

Transfers

In

 Brackets around club names indicate the player's contract with that club had expired before he joined Luton.

Out

 Brackets around club names indicate the player joined that club after his Luton contract expired.

Loan in

Loan out

Appearances and goals
Source:
Numbers in parentheses denote appearances as substitute.
Players with names struck through and marked  left the club during the playing season.
Players with names in italics and marked * were on loan from another club for the whole of their season with Luton.
Players listed with no appearances have been in the matchday squad but only as unused substitutes.
Key to positions: GK – Goalkeeper; DF – Defender; MF – Midfielder; FW – Forward

References

Luton Town F.C. seasons
Luton Town